A gasometer is a gas holder. The word gasometer may also refer to:
Gasometer Oberhausen, a former gas holder converted to an exhibition space
Gasometer, Vienna, any of four former gas tanks in Vienna, Austria
Gasometer (Vienna U-Bahn), a station on line U3

See also
El Nuevo Gasómetro, nickname of Estadio Pedro Bidegain, a stadium in Buenos Aires, Argentina
Estadio Gasómetro, a defunct stadium in Buenos Aires, Argentina
Gas meter